Community First Igloo is a recreational ice rink in Jacksonville, Florida. In addition to skating lessons, figure skating teams, indoor football, and recreational ice hockey, it serves as the home for the Southern Steam indoor football team. It has also served as the home arena for two professional minor league hockey teams, the Jacksonville Bullets and the Jacksonville Barracudas.

The facility served as the home arena for the Jacksonville Bullets, which were owned by Jacksonville Ice owner Bob Sabourin. Later, the Jacksonville Barracudas of the Southern Professional Hockey League (SPHL) used it for training and as an alternate arena when scheduling conflicts precluded them from using their usual venue, the Jacksonville Veterans Memorial Arena. The Barracudas would later play their 2007–2008 season at the rink. The facility has also been used by the various amateur hockey and ice skating clubs, and by the University of Florida Gators club hockey team.

References

External links
Jacksonville Ice Official Website
University of Florida Ice Hockey Website

Indoor ice hockey venues in Florida
Sports venues in Jacksonville, Florida